Risto Punkka (19 March 1957 – July 2014) was a Finnish biathlete. He competed in the 10 km sprint event at the 1984 Winter Olympics.

References

External links
 

1957 births
2014 deaths
Finnish male biathletes
Olympic biathletes of Finland
Biathletes at the 1984 Winter Olympics
People from Lemi
Sportspeople from South Karelia